HLA class II histocompatibility antigen, DM beta chain is a protein that in humans is encoded by the HLA-DMB gene.

Function 

HLA-DMB belongs to the HLA class II beta chain paralogues. This class II molecule is a heterodimer consisting of an alpha (DMA) and a beta (DMB) chain, both anchored in the membrane. It is located in intracellular vesicles. DM plays a central role in the peptide loading of MHC class II molecules by helping to release the CLIP (class II-associated invariant chain peptide) molecule from the peptide binding site. Class II molecules are expressed in antigen presenting cells (APC: B lymphocytes, dendritic cells, macrophages). The beta chain is approximately 26-28 kDa and its gene contains 6 exons. Exon one encodes the leader peptide, exons 2 and 3 encode the two extracellular domains, exon 4 encodes the transmembrane domain and exon 5 encodes the cytoplasmic tail.

Clinical significance 

HLA-DMB is upregulated in tumor tissue of Caucasian but not African patients. Its role in tumor immunology is undefined but has been shown to positively correlated with increased T-cell infiltration and improved prognosis in ovarian cancer. Differential immune processes mediated by HLA-DMB may contribute to the disparity in cancer outcome.

References

Further reading

MHC class II